Ratka Živković (Serbian Cyrillic: Ратка Живковић; born 4 January 1975) is a retired Serbian football player. Amongst the teams she played for were Yumco Vranje, Mašinac Niš in the Serbian First League, Fjölnir and KR in Iceland, and Bulgarian Olympia Sofia. She was a member of the Serbia and Montenegro women's national football team.

References

1975 births
Living people
Women's association football midfielders
Serbian women's footballers
Serbia women's international footballers
Serbian expatriate women's footballers
Serbian expatriate sportspeople in Iceland
Expatriate women's footballers in Iceland
ŽFK Mašinac PZP Niš players
People from Vranje